The Black Crown (stylized as THE BLΔCK CRΦWN) is the third studio album by American deathcore band Suicide Silence, which was released July 12, 2011 through Century Media Records. It is the final album to feature vocalist Mitch Lucker, who died on November 1, 2012.

With anticipation for their third full-length after the release of No Time to Bleed, Suicide Silence prepared recording for The Black Crown on a course of several months starting from the beginning of 2010 with writing ideas and plans before their arrival to the studio for recording in 2011. The album was produced by Steve Evetts.

Lyrical themes
Vocalist Mitch Lucker revealed that the controversial anti-religious lyrics that were included on Suicide Silence's previous albums would not be included on The Black Crown. When asked by Kerrang!, Lucker revealed that the album's lyrical themes would feature more of the personal topics that No Time to Bleed had in-concept. Lucker explained: "I'm not trying to put people's beliefs down - it's about me and my life. This is my head cracked open and poured on the paper! I still have the same beliefs and same views, but I'm more open to everything," he adds. "At this point in my life, I don't see the good in making people hate you for something you say. This record is for everybody."

Cover artwork
The cover for The Black Crown was designed by Ken "K3N" Adams, who designs the artwork for Lamb of God albums as well as many other artists such as Coheed and Cambria and 88 Fingers Louie. The Black Crown was released in several editions such as the standard CD, vinyl (limited to 1000), deluxe edition box set, Digipak limited edition, hot topic version, and a picture disc.

Reception

Garnering positive reviews, The Black Crown was praised by Rock Sound earning a 7 out of 10 rating with a review headline reading "There's no more of that deathcore monotony from Suicide Silence..." and went on further to state "blastbeats and breakneck discordant technicality aren't lacking on the five-piece's third LP, but nor are they over-prescribed. In fact, to the group's merit, there's very little outright and over-used death metal fury, instead it's partially replaced by modern metal ambiguities and churning, lengthy breaks."

Metal Underground stated "What really makes 'The Black Crown' a worthy listen and elevates it above the dime-a-dozen dreck of today's deathcore, though, is the apparent love and respect Suicide Silence has for its two pillars of musical influence: death metal and hardcore. Not metalcore… real hardcore, the tough stuff."

Diminuendo gave much praise to the album, giving the album a rating in amplifier attenuation of 8 out of 11. The held the statement; "Coarse with rapid fret board shred, Suicide Silence does not fail to bewilder fans with mind-blowing disharmony you'll always remember, and pinch harmonics you wish you could forget. The Black Crown demonstrates that deathcore does possess musical merit."

Track listing

Charts

Personnel

Suicide Silence
 Mitch Lucker– vocals
 Mark Heylmun – guitars
 Chris Garza – guitars
 Dan Kenny – bass
 Alex Lopez – drums

Production
Production and engineering by Steve Evetts
Mixing by Chris "Zeuss" Harris at Planet Z Studios, Hadley, Massachusetts
Additional engineering by Allan Hessler
Recorded at The Omen Room Studios, Garden Grove, California
Management by Jerry Clubb for Ricochet Management
A&R by Steve Joh of Century Media
Artwork and layout by Ken Adams
Sound design and programming by Clinton Bradley

References

External links
The Black Crown at Century Media
The Black Crown at Third Degree Merch

Suicide Silence albums
2011 albums
Albums produced by Steve Evetts
Century Media Records albums
Deathcore albums
Nu metalcore albums